Sporetus is a genus of beetles in the family Cerambycidae, containing the following species:

 Sporetus abstrusus Melzer, 1935
 Sporetus bellus Monné, 1976
 Sporetus colobotheides (White, 1855)
 Sporetus decipiens Bates, 1866
 Sporetus distinctus Monné, 1976
 Sporetus fasciatus Martins & Monné, 1974
 Sporetus guttulus (Bates, 1864)
 Sporetus inexpectatus Monné, 1998
 Sporetus porcinus Bates, 1864
 Sporetus probatioides Bates, 1864
 Sporetus seminalis Bates, 1864
 Sporetus variolosus Monné, 1998
 Sporetus venustus Monné, 1998

References

Acanthocinini
Cerambycidae genera